Dario Robleto (born 1972) is an American transdisciplinary artist, researcher, writer, teacher and “citizen-scientist”. His research-driven practice results in intricately handcrafted objects that reflect his exploration of music, popular culture, science, war, and American history.

Early life and education
Robleto was born in San Antonio, Texas, in 1972 and he received his BFA from the University of Texas at San Antonio in 1997.

Work 
Robleto uses unexpected materials such as melted vinyl records, dinosaur bones, meteorites, glass produced by atomic explosions, lost heartbeat recordings from the 19th century, and he transforms these artifacts from the vast inventory of humanity's collective past into delicately layered objects that are sincere and personal meditations on love, death, eroding memory, and healing.

A self-described “materialist poet,” Robleto emphasizes the relationship between language and materials as a crucial component to his approach. “Liner notes,” usually in the form of a wall label, accompany many of the works, poetically detailing the sources embedded therein. A great appreciator of DJ culture, and a former DJ himself, Robleto considers his work a mixtape or “sampling” of humanity; he remixes forgotten stories and materials and reconstructs them into new artistic forms as a lens to view the future through the past.

Increasingly, Robleto has been participating in activities outside the art world. In 2015 he was appointed Artist in Residence in Neuroaesthetics at the University of Houston's Cullen College of Engineering, and he was invited to co-organize the 2016 International Conference on Mobile Brain-Body Imaging and the Neuroscience of Art, Innovation, and Creativity., he is co-organizing year 2 of the conference in 2017. In 2015 Robleto and Contreras-Vidal coauthored a scholarly paper titled "Your Brain on Art: Emergent Cortical Dynamics During Aesthetic Experiences”. The study considered “the brain response to conceptual art [as] studied with mobile electroencephalography (EEG) to examine the neural basis of aesthetic experiences.” In February 2016, Robleto was coeditor of "Mobile Brain/Body Imaging and the Neuroscience of Art, Innovation and Creativity" in a special issue of the science journal Frontiers of Human Neuroscience.

Robleto is currently one of six artists in the Artists-in-Residence program at the prestigious SETI Institute in Mountain View, California, and in 2015 he joined a distinguished team of scientists as the artistic consultant on the Breakthrough Initiatives, which is the most extensive effort to find intelligent life beyond Earth to date. Specifically, Robleto will work on the Breakthrough Message project—a multi-national effort that aims to encourage intellectual and technical debate about how and what to communicate if the current search for intelligent beings beyond Earth is successful.

Teaching and lecturing 
Robleto has been a visiting artist and lecturer at many universities and institutions including Bard College, Annandale-on-Hudson, New York; Massachusetts Institute of Technology, Cambridge, Massachusetts; and the Hubble Space Telescope Science Institute, Baltimore, Maryland. In 2013–2014 he served as the California College of the Arts Viola Frey Distinguished Visiting Professor, Oakland, California, and in 2014–2016 he was an artist in residence at Maryland Institute College of Art. Most recently he was appointed as the first Artist-at-Large at Northwestern University's McCormick School of Engineering and Mary and Leigh Block Museum of Art, Evanston, Illinois.

Awards, recognitions, and media 
Awards have included the 2004 International Association of Art Critics Award for best exhibition in a commercial gallery at the national level. The exhibition was Roses in the Hospital / Men Are The New Women at Inman Gallery in 2003. In 2007 he was a recipient of the Joan Mitchell Foundation Grant and in 2009 he was a recipient of the USA Rasmuson Fellowship. Robleto has been a research fellow and resident at institutions such as the Menil Collection (2014); Rice University (2013–14); and the Smithsonian Museum of American History (2011). He served as the 2016 Texas State Artist Laureate, he currently sits on the advisory board at the Nasher Museum of Art at Duke University and is on the Boston Institute of Contemporary Art Teen Conference Advisory Committee.

Robleto has participated in many residencies including the Headlands Center for the Arts, Sausalito, California, in 2014; and Artpace, San Antonio, Texas, in 2000. In 2017 he was chosen as an Artist in Residence at the Robert Rauschenberg Foundation.

His work has been profiled in numerous publications and media including Radiolab, Krista Tippet's On Being, the New York Times, and the New York Times Science Section.

Robleto's diptych The First Time, The Heart (First Pulse, Flatline), 2017 was awarded a “Prix de Print” award. The Prix de Print is a bimonthly competition, in which a single work is selected by an outside juror to be the subject of a brief essay. Robleto's diptych recalls the method of the first sphygmograph, a technology that made its first marks in soot using a human hair as a stylus, and the data it produced to suggest the life cycle, from the first pulse to the final flat line. Prix de Print

Selected solo exhibitions 
2023
 The Heart’s Knowledge: Science and Empathy in the Art of Dario Robleto, The Block Museum of Art, Northwestern University, Evanston, Illinois
2019
 Unknown and Solitary Seas (Dreams and Emotions of the 19th Century), Radcliffe Institute for Advanced Study, Harvard University, Cambridge, Massachusetts 
2018
 Ancient Beacons Long for Notice, McNay Art Museum, San Antonio, Texas
2014
 Setlists For a Setting Sun, The Baltimore Museum of Art, Baltimore, Maryland 
 The Boundary of Life is Quietly Crossed, The Menil Collection, Houston, Texas
2012
 The Prelives of the Blues, New Orleans Museum of Art, New Orleans, Louisiana
2011
 Survival Does Not Lie in the Heavens, Des Moines Art Center, Des Moines, Iowa
 An Instinct Toward Life, Denver Museum of Contemporary Art, Denver, Colorado
2008
 Alloy of Love, The Francis Young Tang Teaching Museum and Art Gallery at Skidmore College, Saratoga Springs, New York; traveled to the Frye Art Museum, Seattle, Washington
2006
 Chrysanthemum Anthems, Weatherspoon Art Museum, University of North Carolina, Greensboro, North Carolina; traveled to Aldrich Contemporary Art Museum, Ridgefield, Connecticut; Hunter Museum of American Art, Chattanooga, Tennessee
2003
 Say Goodbye to Substance, Whitney Museum of American Art at Altria, New York, New York

Selected group exhibitions 

2019
 In Plain Sight, Mills College Art Museum, Oakland, California 
 The Sorcerer's Burden: Contemporary Art And The Anthropological Turn, The Contemporary Austin, Austin, Texas 
 Jewels In The Concrete, Ruby City, San Antonio, Texas 
 Cosmic Rhythm Vibrations, Nasher Museum of Art, Duke University, Durham, North Carolina
 Ghostly Traces: Memory and Mortality in Contemporary Photography, Vicki Myhren Gallery at University of Denver, Denver, Colorado
 The Sheltering Sky, Palo Alto Art Center, Palo Alto, California
 Fear and Wonder: Sublime Landscapes on Paper, Museum of Fine Arts, Houston, Texas
2018
 Under Construction: Collage from The Mint Museum, Charlotte, North Carolina
 People Get Ready: Building a Contemporary Collection, Nasher Museum of Art at Duke University, Durham, North Carolina
 Texas, Philip Martin Gallery, Los Angeles, California
 Copy, Translate, Repeat: Contemporary Art from the Coleccion Patricia Phelps de Cisneros, Hunter College, 205 Hudson Gallery, New York, New York
2017
 Future Shock, SITE Santa Fe, Santa Fe, New Mexico
 Southern Accent: Seeking the American South in Contemporary Art, Speed Art Museum, Louisville, Kentucky
 If You Remember, I'll Remember, Mary and Leigh Block Museum of Art, North Western University, Evanston, Illinois
 Prospect 4: The Lotus In Spite of the Swamp, New Orleans, Louisiana
2016
 The Future We Remember, Southeastern Center for Contemporary Art, Winston-Salem, North Carolina
 Explode Every Day: An Inquiry into the Phenomena of Wonder, MASS MoCA, North Adams, Massachusetts
 Southern Accent: Seeking the American South in Contemporary Art, Nasher Museum of Art at Duke University, Durham, North Carolina 
2015
 20 Years/20 Shows, SITE Santa Fe, Santa Fe, New Mexico
2014
 DIRGE: Reflections on (Life and) Death, Museum of Contemporary Art, Cleveland, Ohio
2013
 MORE LOVE ART, POLITICS, and SHARING Since the 1990s, Ackland Museum of Art, The University of North Carolina at Chapel Hill, Chapel Hill, North Carolina; traveled to Cheekwood Botanical Garden and Museum of Art, Nashville, Tennessee
2012
 More Real? Art in the Age of Truthiness, Minneapolis Institute of Art, Minneapolis, Minnesota; traveled to SITE Santa Fe, Santa Fe, New Mexico
2011
 The Spectacular of Vernacular, Walker Art Center, Minneapolis, Minnesota; traveled to Contemporary Arts Museum, Houston, Texas; Montclair Art Museum, Montclair, New Jersey; Ackland Art Museum, The University of North Carolina at Chapel Hill, Chapel Hill, North Carolina
2010
 The Record: Contemporary ART and VINYL, Nasher Museum of Art at Duke University, Durham, North Carolina; traveled to Institute of Contemporary Art, Boston, Massachusetts; Miami Art Museum, Miami, Florida; Henry Art Gallery, University of Washington, Seattle, Washington
2008
 The Old, Weird America, Contemporary Arts Museum, Houston, Texas; traveled to DeCordova Museum and Sculpture Park, Lincoln, Massachusetts; Frye Art Museum, Seattle, Washington
2004
 2004 Biennial Exhibition, Whitney Museum of American Art, New York, New York

Publications: author and co-author

2019   
 Contreras-Vidal J.L., Robleto, D., Jesus G. Cruz-Garza J.G., José M. Azorín J.M., Nam, C.S., "Mobile Brain-Body Imaging and the Neuroscience of Art, Innovation and Creativity (Springer Series on Bio- and Neurosystems)" Springer, Cham 
 Cruz-Garza J.G., Chatufale G., Robleto D., Contreras-Vidal J.L. "Your Brain on Art: A New Paradigm to Study Artistic Creativity Based on the ‘Exquisite Corpse’ Using Mobile Brain-Body Imaging." Brain Art. Nijholt A. (eds) Springer, Cham 
 The Heart's Knowledge Will Never Decay, Designing For Empathy: Perspectives On the Museum Experience, edited by. Elif M. Gokcigdem, 18-29. Rowman & Littlefield, 2019 
 Contreras-Vidal, Jose L., Jeannie Kever, Dario Robleto, and James Rosengren. "At the Crossroads of Art and Science: Neuroaesthetics Begins to Come into Its Own," Leonardo, Volume 52, Issue 1, February 1 

2018     
 Berry, Ian, Rebecca McNamara. Accelerate No.2. Saratoga Springs, New York. The Frances Young Tang Teaching Museum and Art Gallery 
 Montgomery, Harper. Copy, Translate, Repeat: Contemporary Art from the Colección Patricia Phelps de Cisneros. New York, New York. Hunter College Art Galleries 

2017	
 Contreras-Vidal, Jose Luis, Robleto, Dario. “Looking Under the Sacred Rock: How Collaborations between Scientists and Artists Can More Deeply Probe the Mysteries of Creativity,” SCIART Magazine, August 
 Contreras-Vidal, Kever, Robleto, and Rosengren, James. “At the Crossroads of Art and Science: Neuroaesthetics Begins to Come into Its Own,” Leonardo, June 20
 Cruz-Garza, Brantley, Nakagome, Kontson, Megjhani, Robleto, Contreras-Vidal. “Deployment of Mobile EEG Technology in an Art Museum Setting: Evaluation of Signal Quality and Usability,” Frontiers In Human Neuroscience, November 10 

2016	
 "Dreams, as Faithful as Flames.” Paper presented at International Conference on Mobile Brain-Body Imaging and The Neuroscience of Art, Innovation and Creativity, Cancun, Mexico, July 
 “Honky-Tonks and Hospices,” Southern Accent: Seeking the American South in Contemporary Art (Nasher Museum of Art at Duke University, Durham, North Carolina, exhibition catalogue)
 Gramann, Contreras-Vidal, Makeig, Robleto, Brandt, Frazier and Schmuckli. “Mobile Brain/Body Imaging and the Neuroscience of Art, Innovation and Creativity,” Frontiers in Human Neuroscience, February

2015	
 Kontson, Megjhani, Brantley, Cruz-Garza, Nakagome, Robleto, White, Civillico and Contreras-Vidal. “Your Brain on Art: Emergent Cortical Dynamics During Aesthetic Experiences,” Frontiers in Human Neuroscience, November 18 

2014	
 White and Robleto. The Boundary of Life Is Quietly Crossed. (The Menil Collection, Houston Texas, exhibition brochure).

2013	
 “If You Remember, I'll Remember,” Disembodied Portraits: Portrait Miniatures and Their Contemporary Relatives (The Cleveland Museum of Art, Cleveland, Ohio, exhibition catalogue) 

2012	
 “Lunge For Love As If It Were Air,” More Love: ART, POLITICS and SHARING Since the 1990s (Ackland Art Museum, Chapel Hill, North Carolina, exhibition catalogue) 

2010	
 “Every Record, Everywhere, Is Playing Our Song Right Now,” The Record: Contemporary Art and Vinyl (Nasher Museum of Art at Duke University, Durham, North Carolina, exhibition catalogue) 

2001	
 “When You Cry, I Only Love You More,” ArtLies, Fall. pp 3–7 

1999	
 “I Love Everything Rock ‘n’ Roll (Except the Music),” The National Association of Artists’ Organizations Field Guide 1999–2000

Videos

 The First Time, The Heart Dario Robleto and Adrian Matejka in Conversation Inman Gallery, Houston, Texas
 The First time, the Heart: Dario Robleto and Adrian Matejka in Conversation Part 2 Inman Gallery, Houston, Texas
 The Heart’s Knowledge Will Never Decay: A conversation between Dario Robleto and Dr. Doris Taylor The MATCH, Houston, Texas 
 Exploring Ethics: Across Art, Humanities and Science The Block Museum of Art, Northwestern University, Evanston, Illinois 
 Dario Robleto: The Art of Scientific Storytelling Northwestern PhD Seminar Series, Northwestern University, Evanston, Illinois 
 Dario Robleto: Ancient Beacons Long for Notice at the McNay Art Museum The McNay Art Museum, San Antonio, Texas 
 Dario Robleto And Patrick Feaster: Unlocking Sounds of the Past The Block Museum of Art, Northwestern University, Evanston, Illinois 
 Ann Druyan in Conversation with Dario Robleto SITE Santa Fe, Santa Fe, New Mexico 
 Art Engineering Interview: Dario Robleto The Block Museum of Art, Northwestern University, Evanston, Illinois 
 Opening Day Conversation for the Exhibition If You Remember, I'll Remember The Block Museum of Art, Northwestern University, Evanston, Illinois 
 Insights Into the Interplay Between Science and Art: Dario Robleto at the Hubble Space Telescope Science Institute The Space Telescope Science Institute, Baltimore, Maryland 
 Panel Discussion at Artpace Celebrating Hare & Hound Press Artpace, San Antonio, Texas
 Conversation with the Artist: Mimi Swartz, Dr. Bud Frazier, Dr. Billy Cohn and Dario Robleto The Menil Collection, Houston, Texas 
 Conversation with the Artist: Patrick Feaster and Dario Robleto The Menil Collection, Houston, Texas
 Conversation with the Artist: Ann Druyan & Dario Robleto The Menil Collection, Houston, Texas 
 Why the Civil War Still Matters to American Artists: Dario Robleto Smithsonian American Art Museum, Washington, D.C.

Selected public collections
 Albright–Knox Art Gallery, Buffalo, New York
 Altoids Curiously Strong Collection/New Museum of Contemporary Art, New York, New York
 Austin Museum of Art, Austin, Texas
 Colección Patricia Phelps de Cisneros, New York, New York
 Des Moines Art Center, Des Moines, Iowa
 Hirshhorn Museum and Sculpture Garden, Washington, D.C.
 Jack S. Blanton Museum of Art, University of Texas, Austin, Texas
 Le Centre d'Art Contemporain, Montpellier, France
 Linda Pace Foundation, San Antonio, Texas
 Los Angeles County Museum of Art, Los Angeles, California
 Museum of Contemporary Art, San Diego, California
 Nasher Museum of Art at Duke University, Durham, North Carolina
 New Orleans Museum of Art, New Orleans, Louisiana
 The Baltimore Museum of Art, Baltimore, Maryland
 The Frances Young Tang Teaching Museum, Saratoga Springs, New York
 The Menil Collection, Houston, Texas
 The Museum of Fine Arts, Houston, Texas
 Ulrich Museum of Art, Wichita State University, Wichita, Kansas
 Whitney Museum of American Art, New York, New York

Selected catalogues
 Lash, Miranda, Trevor Schoonmaker. Southern Accent: Seeking the American South in Contemporary Art. Exhibition catalogue. Durham, North Carolina: Nasher Museum of Art at Duke University (2016)
 Markonish, Denise. Explode Everyday; An Inquiry into the Phenomena of Wonder. Exhibition catalogue. New York, New York: Prestel (2016)
 Dirge: Reflections on [Life and Death], Museum of Contemporary Art Cleveland, Cleaveland, Ohio (2014)
 Art and Alchemy: The Mystery of Transformation, Munich, Germany (2014)
 MORE LOVE: ART, POLITICS, and SHARING Since the 1990s. Chapel Hill, North Carolina: Ackland Art Museum (2014)
 110 Favorites from the Collection, The University of Texas Press, Austin, Texas (2013)
Disembodied: Portrait Miniatures and Their Contemporary Relatives, The Cleveland Museum of Art, Cleveland, Ohio (2013)
 Dario Robleto: Prelives of the Blues, New Orleans Museum of Art (2012)
 MO/RE/RE/AL? Art In The Age of Truthiness, Minneapolis Institute of Arts, Minneapolis, Minnesota (2012)
 An Instinct Toward Life, Museum of Contemporary Art Denver (2011)
 Spectacular of Vernacular, Walker Art Center, Minneapolis, Minnesota (2011)
 Dario Robleto: Survival Does Not Lie In The Heavens, Des Moines Art Center, Des Moines, Iowa (2011)
 The Record: Contemporary ART and VINYL, Nasher Museum of Art at Duke University, Durham, North Carolina (2010)
 Alloy of Love, Frances Young Tang Teaching Museum and Art Gallery, Saratoga Springs, New York (2008)
 The Old, Weird America: Folk Themes in Contemporary Art, Contemporary Arts Museum, Houston, Texas (2008)
 Chrysanthemum Anthems, The Weatherspoon Art Museum, Greensboro, North Carolina (2007)

References

External links
 Dario Robleto
 Dario Robleto at Inman Gallery
 "The Echoes of Hearts Long Silenced", The New York Times
 "ART/ARCHITECTURE; Conceptual Artist As Mad Scientist", The New York Times
 Dario Robleto on artnet.com
 “Space”, Radiolab, Season 2, Episode 5, New York Public Radio
 "Dario Robleto: Sculptor of Memory”, On Being with Krista Tippett, APM
 

American conceptual artists
Living people
1972 births
University of Texas at San Antonio alumni